Sascia Kraus (born 3 March 1993) is a Swiss synchronized swimmer. She competed in the women's duet at the 2016 Summer Olympics.

References

1993 births
Living people
Swiss synchronized swimmers
Olympic synchronized swimmers of Switzerland
Synchronized swimmers at the 2016 Summer Olympics
Place of birth missing (living people)